The Greensboro Generals were an East Coast Hockey League team based in Greensboro, North Carolina, and played at the Greensboro Coliseum from 1999 to 2004. The name was originally used by the Greensboro Generals in the Eastern Hockey League.

The ECHL Generals franchise replaced the Greensboro Monarchs in the city, which had played from 1989 until 1995 before the ownership bought an expansion franchise in the American Hockey League, called the Carolina Monarchs. Both the original Generals and ECHL Monarchs were considered as some of the first southern hockey franchises to build a loyal fan base and draw consistent attendance at their games.

In 1997, the AHL's Carolina Monarchs would fold after only two seasons as the Coliseum became host to the relocated Carolina Hurricanes of the National Hockey League. During that time, a new arena was being built for the NHL team in Raleigh, North Carolina, but would not open until 1999. Prior to the Hurricanes' arrival, the Coliseum was required to make vast improvements to the arena in order to satisfy NHL regulations. Among them were the addition of VIP Suites, a members only club area and upgrades to the ice surface and locker room facilities.

Following the Hurricanes' departure, local attorneys Art Donaldson and James Roscetti entered into negotiations with the East Coast Hockey League to secure a franchise for Greensboro. Donaldson and Roscetti were awarded a franchise in July 1999 and had only three months to put together a front office, coaching staff and team. Donaldson and Roscetti decided to bring attention to the franchise right away by hiring former popular ECHL Monarchs' coach Jeff Brubaker as head coach and general manager for their inaugural season.

Season-by-season record

References

Defunct ECHL teams
Ice hockey teams in North Carolina
Sports in Greensboro, North Carolina
Eastern Hockey League teams
Defunct ice hockey teams in the United States
Carolina Hurricanes minor league affiliates